Blue and White ( Kaḥol Lavan) is a centrist and liberal political alliance in Israel. It was established by the Israel Resilience Party, Yesh Atid and Telem to run in the April 2019 Knesset election, in hopes of defeating Prime Minister Benjamin Netanyahu. Blue and White defines itself as a pluralistic alliance representing all citizens on the political and religious spectrums. The phrase "blue and white" refers to the colors of the Israeli flag, and is colloquially used to describe something as being typically Israeli.

Following the March 2020 elections, Blue and White leader Benny Gantz was tasked with forming a new government after receiving endorsements from a majority of 61 MKs. Amidst the COVID-19 pandemic, Gantz instead opted to put himself forward as interim Speaker of the Knesset while continuing negotiations to form a coalition government with Benjamin Netanyahu's Likud and other parties.

The effect was a break-up of the Blue and White alliance. The alliance split on 29 March 2020, with the Israel Resilience Party keeping the name Blue and White. Yesh Atid and Telem left the alliance and formed a separate faction in the Knesset. On 20 April, a coalition deal was signed with Likud, in which Netanyahu would serve first as prime minister, and Blue and White leader Benny Gantz would serve as prime minister starting October 2021, as well as giving the party ministerial portfolios such as defense ministers and foreign minister. However, this deal was never realized, because the Knesset collapsed in December 2020 after a major budget dispute, triggering new elections in March 2021. In the 2021 legislative election, Blue and White won eight seats.

History 

On 21 February 2019, the last day for submitting election lists for the Knesset, Yesh Atid and Israel Resilience announced that they would form an alliance for the upcoming election. Gabi Ashkenazi, also a former chief of staff, would join the list in the fourth spot.

Blue and White won 35 seats in the April 2019 Israeli legislative election, the same as Likud, and conceded defeat. Benjamin Netanyahu's party was tasked by President Reuven Rivlin with forming a governing coalition, but failed. This triggered the September 2019 Israeli legislative election.

In the 2020 Israeli legislative election, Blue and White won 33 seats, placing it second after Likud which had 36. On 8 March 2020, Avigdor Lieberman gave Gantz his backing to form a new government. The next day, the Joint List agreed to work with Gantz and Lieberman to oust Netanyahu. As of 10 March 2020, it remained unclear whether Gantz would be able to gain sufficient MK votes to form a government, as Labor-Gesher-Meretz MK Orly Levy announced she would not support a minority government and left the Labor-Meretz alliance. Zvi Hauser and Yoaz Hendel (both Blue and White MKs) had also previously made known that they would not support a government with the Joint List's support. An aide also stated that Gantz plans to form a government by 23 March. Lieberman and Labor party leader Amir Peretz also reaffirmed on 11 March that an alliance with the Joint List would not change their position on forming a political alliance with Gantz. On 15 March 2020, 61 of the 120 MKs told Israeli President Reuven Rivlin that they would back Gantz as Israeli Prime Minister, which resulted in Rivlin announcing that he had asked Gantz to form the new government. On 26 March, one day after Knesset Speaker Yuli Edelstein resigned, Gantz instead agreed to become Speaker of the Knesset. The fact that right-wingers in Likud Prime Minister Benjamin Netanyahu's coalition agreed to support Gantz's bid to become Speaker put the future of the Blue and White alliance in jeopardy. The same day, MKs elected Gantz as the new Speaker of the Knesset by a margin of 74–18, with Yesh Atid, Labor and Yisrael Beytenu MKs boycotting the vote.

However, Lapid's Yesh Atid and Ya'alon's Telem asked to split from the Israel Resilience Party, and requested that the two parties keep the name Blue and White as the name of their recreated political party. On 27 March 2020, it was revealed that a major obstacle to a potential long-term alliance between Gantz and Netanyahu emerged with regards to implementing U.S. President Donald Trump's Middle East peace plan. Barak Ravid of Israel's Channel 13 news revealed that Gantz, despite previously claiming that he wanted to implement this peace plan, still wanted to hold peace talks with the Palestinians, which Trump and Netanyahu still opposed. Ravid stated that this would likely make the upcoming deal between Gantz and Netanyahu short-lived. As part of the proposed coalition deal between Netanyahu and Gantz, Gantz would replace Netanyahu as Prime Minister of Israel in 18 months. Subsequently, after long negotiations a compromise deal was reached over the peace plan.

On 6 April 2020, Amir Peretz, leader of the Israeli Labor Party, announced that his party might be merging with Blue and White.

On 20 April 2020, the coalition deal was officially signed, with Blue and White having an equal number of ministers as the Right. Blue and White received the Justice, Economy, Labor and Welfare, Communications, Agriculture, Culture and Sports, Absorption, Tourism, Minorities, Diaspora, Science and Space, Strategic Affairs, and Social Affairs ministries. The positions of foreign minister, energy minister and environmental protection minister will rotate upon the change of prime minister. The terms of the agreement also provide that Gantz serve as defense minister when the new government is sworn in.

On 30 April, the bill approving the new coalition government was given its first approval in Knesset. On 6 May, the coalition agreement was approved by the Israeli Supreme Court. The same day, both Blue and White and Likud issued a joint statement claiming that the new unity government would be sworn in the following week. On 7 May, the bill approving the new government became law after it was given its final approval in Knesset. The new Israeli government, consisting of many Blue and White and Likud coalition members, was sworn in on 17 May 2020.

On 10 July 2022 Gantz and Gideon Sa'ar agreed to sign a joint faction agreement, under the overall name Blue and White–New Hope. Gantz will be the candidate for prime minister and Sa'ar will be a candidate for the post of senior government minister.

Composition 
Blue and White consists of one political party, Israel Resilience, which holds eight seats in the Knesset. Yesh Atid and Telem were previously part of an alliance with Israel Resilience. While not being formally part of it, the Israeli Labor Party and Derekh Eretz have worked with the alliance on a parliamentary basis during the term of the twenty-third Knesset. On 10 July 2022, Blue and White signed a joint ticket agreement with New Hope, for the upcoming legislative election. The ticket was named Blue and White-New Hope, with Gantz as its prime ministerial candidate.

Current

Former

Israel Resilience Party
On 16 February 2015, Benny Gantz completed his term as Chief of Staff and began a three-year legal moratorium in which he could not run for the Knesset. This ended on 2 July 2018. In September 2018, it was reported that Gantz planned to enter politics. On 26 December 2018, the 20th Knesset voted to dissolve itself and hold early elections. A day later, on 27 December, after 109 people signed a list of founders, the party was officially registered with the name Israel Resilience Party.

Telem
In May 2016, "amidst wide-spread speculation that he would be fired by Netanyahu", Moshe Ya'alon resigned from his defense minister post. On 12 March 2017, Ya'alon officially relinquished his membership of Likud, announcing that he would form a new party to challenge Netanyahu in the next election. Ya'alon registered Telem on 2 January 2019. Telem announced an alliance with Israel Resilience on 29 January 2019.

Yesh Atid
Yesh Atid was founded by Yair Lapid in 2012, running on a platform of representing the centre of Israeli society. In 2013, it placed second in the general election, winning 19 seats. It then entered into a coalition led by Benjamin Netanyahu's Likud. In the lead-up to the 2015 election, Lapid's campaign continued to emphasize economic issues, while heavily criticizing Netanyahu and his Likud party. Receiving 11 seats, they placed fourth and sat in the opposition.

Platform and positions 
On 25 February 2019, Lapid stated that the alliance wished to amend the Nation-State Bill, intending to add a civil equality article. Blue and White's manifesto was released on 6 March 2019. The document reveals positions on a number of policy areas, key among them a commitment to engage with peace-minded Arab neighbors and a willingness to enter into negotiations with the Palestinians, albeit without land concessions.

Since the split and Gantz joining Netanyahu, many of the policies listed below have been abandoned by Blue and White.

Policies included limiting the prime minister to eight years or three terms and preventing anyone convicted of a serious crime from being a public official. The alliance stated that they would return money previously taken by political parties in behind-the-scene deals and using it to reduce the cost of health care, education, and living. A diplomatic initiative for peace with the Palestinians was put forward. The alliance also supported the right of citizens to marry, divorce, parent, and be buried according to their specific beliefs, and the responsibility of all citizens to serve in the army, regardless of their religious levels.

During its March 2019 campaign, the alliance's platform included the following pledges:
 Governmental corruption: Impose term limits on the prime minister to a maximum of three terms or eight years. Indicted or convicted politicians would be barred from running for public office. Gantz abandoned that once he scrapped the bill to ban an indicted person from being given the Prime Ministerial mandate.
 Religion and state: The protection of the Jewish identity of the state, as well as the identities of all of its citizens. Civil marriage would be made permissible in some form, allowing people to marry according to their own beliefs. Enforce the 2016 agreement to create an expanded place for egalitarian prayers at the Western Wall, which had been suspended by the Netanyahu government. Gantz abandoned that plan once he entered into a Netanyahu-led government.
 Education: Investing in early education and kindergartens and subsidising daycare for young children. English and mathematics would be highly prioritized in elementary, middle, and high school. 
 Health: Approximately 12.5 billion NIS (US$3.4 billion) would be invested in health care for all Israeli citizens. The alliance pledged to fight hospital closures and to increase access to medicine throughout the country, including the periphery. This was scrapped for a bigger spending bill to manage the COVID-19 pandemic.
 Economy: Shift to a focus on macroeconomics, seek to encourage innovation in STEM fields, and encourage more women and Hasidic Jews to enter the workforce.
 Israel-Palestinian conflict: On 7 March, in a speech to an English-speaking audience, Lapid laid out four conditions for a peace deal with the Palestinians. Those were later abandoned by Gantz when he entered the Netanyahu coalition and agreed to an annexation plan.
 The Jordan Valley remaining in Israeli hands.
 No Palestinian right of return.
Jerusalem remaining the undivided capital of Israel.

Leaders 

The alliance is led by Benny Gantz. Formerly Yair Lapid and Gantz served as co-leaders, until the 2020 split within the party.

The agreement was should it become the lead faction in forming a government, the two agreed to a rotation which would have had Gantz serving for the first two years as prime minister, with Lapid as foreign minister and Telem leader Moshe Ya'alon (in the third slot on the list) as defense minister. For the next two years, Lapid would have served as prime minister, with Gantz as defense minister.

Election results

References

External links

2019 establishments in Israel
2022 disestablishments in Israel
Liberal parties in Israel
Political parties disestablished in 2022
Political parties established in 2019
Political party alliances in Israel
Zionist political parties in Israel